Søren Dahl (born 15 July 1993) is a Danish swimmer. He competed in the men's 4 × 200 metre freestyle relay event at the 2016 Summer Olympics.

He studied at North Carolina State University, where he is a member of the NC State swimming and Diving team.  Dahl won two NCAA titles at he 2016 and 2017 NCAA Division I Men's Swimming and Diving Championships. His first title came as part of the NC State 400 freestyle relay squad, the first national relay championship for NC State and the ACC conference. Then in 2017, the NC State 800 freestyle relay squad won the national championship. Held, Vazaios, Ress, and Dahl put up the fastest time in history setting both NCAA and U.S. open records.

In 2018, Dahl was named as a recipient of the Atlantic Coast Conference Postgraduate Scholarship. The scholarship is awarded to student-athletes that has performed with distinction in both the classroom and their respective sport, while demonstrating exemplary conduct in the community. In May 2018, Dahl was awarded a prestigious NCAA scholarship - the Jim Mckay Scholarship.

Personal life
Dahl is openly gay, and is in a relationship with NFL player Carl Nassib.

References

External links
 

1993 births
Living people
Danish male freestyle swimmers
Olympic swimmers of Denmark
Swimmers at the 2016 Summer Olympics
Place of birth missing (living people)
LGBT swimmers
Danish LGBT sportspeople
Gay sportsmen
Danish gay men
21st-century Danish LGBT people